After five seasons in the National Association, the 1876 New York Mutuals finished with a record of 21–35, good for 6th place in the National League. It would prove to be their only season in the league, as they were expelled from the league as punishment for refusing to make a late-season road trip during the season.

Regular season

Season standings

Record vs. opponents

Roster

Player stats

Batting

Starters by position
Note: Pos = Position; G = Games played; AB = At bats; H = Hits; Avg. = Batting average; HR = Home runs; RBI = Runs batted in

Other batters
Note: G = Games played; AB = At bats; H = Hits; Avg. = Batting average; HR = Home runs; Runs batted in

Pitching

Starting pitchers
Note: G = Games pitched; IP = Innings pitched; W = Wins; L = Losses; ERA = Earned run average; SO = Strikeouts

Relief pitchers
Note: G = Games pitched; W = Wins; L = Losses; SV = Saves; ERA = Earned run average; SO = Strikeouts

References

 1876 New York Mutuals team page at Baseball Reference

New York Mutuals season
New York Mutuals seasons
New York Mut
19th century in Brooklyn
Williamsburg, Brooklyn